The Commonwealth of Thieves: The Story of the Founding of Australia is a popular history book written by Thomas Keneally published in 2005.

It has been published with slightly different titles, such as A Commonwealth of Thieves: The Improbable Birth of Australia and The Commonwealth of Thieves: The birth of Australia.

References

History books about Australia
2005 non-fiction books